Eriocrania breviapex is a moth of the family Eriocraniidae. It is found in the Cayuga Lake Basin of north-western New York.

The wingspan is 7.5–9 mm. The forewings are light fuscous with a slight bronze to purplish iridescence, irregularly marked with small pale golden to brassy spots. The hindwings are paler than the forewings and sparsely scaled with long, slender, hairlike brownish-fuscous scales. Adults are on wing from early to mid May in one generation per year.

References

breviapex
Endemic fauna of the United States
Leaf miners
Lepidoptera of the United States
Moths described in 1978
Taxa named by Donald R. Davis (entomologist)